
Year 428 (CDXXVIII) was a leap year starting on Sunday (link will display the full calendar) of the Julian calendar. At the time, it was known as the Year of the Consulship of Felix and Taurus (or, less frequently, year 1181 Ab urbe condita). The denomination 428 for this year has been used since the early medieval period, when the Anno Domini calendar era became the prevalent method in Europe for naming years.

Events 
 By place 

 Roman Empire 
 Flavius Felix is elected consul for the Western Empire and issues consular diptychs during his political office.

 Europe 
 King Gunderic, age 49, dies after a reign of 21 years, and is succeeded by his half-brother Genseric. He is styled with the title Rex Wandalorum et Alanorum ("King of the Vandals and Alans"). Genseric increases his power and wealth in the residence of the province of Hispania Baetica (Southern Spain).
 King Vortigern invites a number of Germanic warriors to aid him in consolidating his position in Britain, according to the Historia Brittonum. He hires Saxons who are probably settled in Kent as mercenaries to fight against the Picts and the Scots beyond Hadrian's Wall.
 Chlodio, king of the Salian Franks, invades Northern Gaul and defeats the Roman army at Cambrai. He extends his kingdom south to the River Somme and makes Tournai (modern Belgium) his residence. Frankish expansion changes the borders, founding Francia.

 Asia 
 Artaxias IV, last king of Greater Armenia, is deposed by Bahram V. The Arshakuni Dynasty ends and the kingdom becomes a province of the Persian Empire.

 By topic 

 Astronomy 
 October 26 – The planet Venus occults the planet Jupiter.

 Religion 
 April 10 – Nestorius is made patriarch of Constantinople. He preaches a new doctrine that will be called Nestorianism. It makes a distinction between the divine and human natures of Jesus but comes under immediate attack from pope Celestine I and Cyril of Alexandria.
 Hydatius becomes bishop of Aquae Flaviae in Gallaecia (modern Chaves) in Portugal.
 John succeeds Theodotus as patriarch of Antioch, and gives his support to Nestorius.
 Euthymius the Great builds a monastery in Palestine, near the Dead Sea.

Births 
 Tuoba Huang, prince of the Xianbei state Northern Wei (d. 451)

Deaths 
 Gunderic, king of the Vandals and Alans (b. 379)
 Qifu Chipan, prince of the Xianbei state Western Qin
 Theodore of Mopsuestia, bishop and theologian

References 

 Giusto Traina: 428 A.D. An Ordinary Year at the End of the Roman Empire. Princeton University Press, Princeton 2011, .